The North Carolina Tar Heels women's soccer team represent the University of North Carolina at Chapel Hill in the Atlantic Coast Conference of NCAA Division I soccer. The team has won 22 of the 35 Atlantic Coast Conference championships, and 21 of the 41 NCAA national championships. The team has participated in every NCAA tournament.

History
The UNC women's soccer team began as a club team established by students looking for high level competition.  In 1979, they petitioned the UNC Athletic Director, Bill Cobey, to take the club to the varsity level.  Cobey asked Anson Dorrance, then the UNC men's soccer coach to assess the club's ability to transition to varsity status.  Dorrance was impressed enough by the club, then coached by Mike Byers, to recommend that the school form a women's soccer team.  Cobey agreed and hired Dorrance as head coach, with Byers as an assistant, for the 1978 season.  That year, the Tar Heels played an essentially club schedule, including games against high school teams.  However, in 1979, the Association for Intercollegiate Athletics for Women, at the prompting of Dorrance and University of Colorado coach, Chris Lidstone, established a national women's soccer program.  At the time, UNC had the only varsity women's soccer team in the Southeast and this allowed Dorrance to recruit the top talent in the region.  In 1981, he recruited one of the most talented freshman squads in the history of women's soccer.  Eight of those recruits won starting positions and took the team to the first, and only, AIAW national championship.  This group would set the tone for Tar Heels soccer for down through its history.  As Dorrance recalls it, "These were the true pioneers. They were given nothing. They were accustomed to taking things and so they weren't as genteel as the sort of young ladies we can recruit now. . .  They were the sort of girls who would go downtown, burn it to the ground, . . . But then, they were on time for every single practice and in practice they worked themselves until they were bleeding and throwing up. They had a tremendous commitment to victory and to personal athletic excellence. And for that I admired them because they were a tremendous group. And even though, off the field, I think they all hated each other. But once the game began, there was a collective fury that just intimidated everyone they played against."  Building on that competitive drive, the Tar Heels went on to win the first three NCAA championships, and dominate the sport for years to come.

All-time record

Current roster

Individual honors 

National Coach of the Year:
 Anson Dorrance – 1982, 1986, 1997, 2000, 2001, 2003, 2006

ACC Coach of the Year:
 Anson Dorrance – 1982, 1986, 1997, 2000, 2001, 2003, 2004, 2006, 2018, 2019

Hermann Trophy:
 Shannon Higgins – 1989
 Kristine Lilly – 1991
 Mia Hamm – 1992, 1993
 Tisha Venturini – 1994
 Cindy Parlow – 1997, 1998
 Cat Reddick – 2003
 Crystal Dunn – 2012

ACC Player of the Year:
 Mia Hamm – 1990, 1992, 1993
 Cindy Parlow – 1998

ACC Defensive Player of the Year:
 Crystal Dunn – 2013

ACC Offensive Player of the Year:
 Heather O'Reilly – 2005
 Yael Averbuch – 2006
 Crystal Dunn – 2013
 Alessia Russo – 2018

ACC Rookie of the Year:  
 Tisha Venturini – 1991
 Cindy Parlow – 1995
 Laurie Schwoy – 1996
 Lindsay Tarpley – 2002
Maycee Bell - 2019

NCAA Tournament MVP:
 April Heinrichs – 1984 (last year overall MVP named)

Offensive Player of the NCAA Tournament:
 April Heinrichs – 1985, 1986
 Kristine Lilly – 1989, 1990
 Mia Hamm – 1992, 1993
 Tisha Venturini – 1994
 Debbie Keller – 1996
 Robin Confer – 1997
 Susan Bush – 1999
 Meredith Florance – 2000
 Heather O'Reilly – 2003, 2006
 Kealia Ohai – 2012

Defensive Player of the Tournament:
 Suzy Cobb – 1983
 Carla Overbeck – 1988
 Tracy Bates – 1989
 Tisha Venturini – 1991
 Staci Wilson – 1994
 Nel Fettig – 1996
 Siri Mullinix – 1997
 Lorrie Fair – 1999
 Cat Reddick – 2000, 2003
 Robyn Gayle – 2006
 Satara Murray – 2012

First Team All-America Selection: As of 2011, North Carolina had 70 players gain first-team All-American recognition.  The next two schools with the greatest number of All-Americans were tied with twenty-two each.

Notable Alumnae 

 Emily Pickering
 Tisha Venturini
 Mia Hamm
 Sarina Wiegman
 Kristine Lilly
 Heather O'Reilly
 Meghan Klingenberg
 Lori Chalupny
 Whitney Engen
 Lucy Bronze
 Katie Bowen
 Tobin Heath
 Crystal Dunn
 Kendall Fletcher
 Ashlyn Harris
 Allie Long
 Jessica McDonald
 Lotte Wubben-Moy
 Alessia Russo
 Meredith Florance

References

External links

 

 
Soccer clubs in North Carolina
NCAA Division I women's soccer teams